During the 2002–03 Italian football season, Empoli F.C. competed in the Serie A.

Kit
Empoli's kit was manufactured by Italian sports retailer Erreà and sponsored by Sammontana.

Squad

Goalkeepers
  Gianluca Berti
  Mario Cassano
  Giacomo Mazzi

Defenders
  Gianluca Atzori
  Manuel Belleri
  Cribari
  Andrea Cupi
  Stefano Lucchini

Midfielders
  Alessandro Agostini
  Marco Barollo
  Antonio Buscè
  Fabrizio Ficini
  Flavio Giampieretti
  Vincenzo Grella
  Francesco Lodi
  Francesco Pratali
  Ighli Vannucchi

Attackers
  Marco Borriello
  Massimiliano Cappellini
  Antonio Di Natale
  Gaetano Grieco
  Tommaso Rocchi
  Luca Saudati
  Francesco Tavano

Serie A

References

Empoli F.C. seasons
Empoli